The Union Hotel is a historic landmark located on Main Street in Flemington, New Jersey. It is a contributing property to the Flemington Historic District.

First constructed by Neal Hart in 1814, it served as a gathering place for well-to-do stagecoach passengers and socialites throughout the 19th Century, as well as many local characters and tourists visiting the area. The exterior of the present building dates to 1878.

It gained national notoriety in the early months of 1935 when the trial of Bruno Hauptmann for the kidnapping of Charles A. Lindbergh, Jr. was conducted directly across the street at the Hunterdon County Courthouse and members of the national media covering the trial all stayed at the hotel.

Decades later the property was purchased by new owners, renovated, restored, and converted into what is now officially known as the Union Hotel Restaurant. The second and third floors (which once housed hotel patrons) were left empty and unoccupied, adding to the growing mythos surrounding the widely recognized Hunterdon County icon.

Murals created by Carl Ritz with the assistance of Kurt Wiese adorn the hotel.

2008 closure
In July 2008, managing partner John Blanos announced that the Union Hotel Restaurant would sell its liquor license but remain open. However, in August he announced that the restaurant would close, and that the liquor license would be sold to Bensi, an Italian chain restaurant soon to open elsewhere in Flemington. At a special Flemington Borough Council meeting in September 2008, the transfer of the liquor license was rejected, but Blanos nonetheless stated that the restaurant would close immediately and that he was negotiating with a potential buyer. Blanos said that the Union Hotel had been steadily losing money since he and his partners bought it in 1999.

Redevelopment
In November 2012, the Flemington Borough Council selected Flemington Union Hotel LLC to revive and restore the once prominent Union Hotel on historic Main Street. Flemington Union Hotel LLC's principals Matt McPherson and Liam Burns envision to revive the Union Hotel as a 50- to 55-room hotel that would expand into the building next door at 78 Main St. The plan calls for adding a ballroom on the back and establishing an elegant steakhouse and a casual pub on the ground floor. A special legislative bill is proposed to allow for a liquor license.
In February 2016 it was announced that the Union Hotel would be demolished and replaced with a new building on the site. This caused much controversy in and around Flemington, and despite this controversy, the Flemington council approved the plans.

In May 2017, plans to demolish the hotel were scuttled  and a new plan to utilize the building was introduced.

Legends
The belief that the hotel was haunted is quite prevalent, though few members of the public were ever allotted access to levels above the dining hall where a few rooms are used by management for business purposes and ghost sightings or poltergeist incidents have been reported by employees. One reported seeing a pair of shoes walk up a staircase all by themselves. Others have told of hearing or seeing small children in rooms despite the absence of hotel guests. The manager claimed to have felt an unseen presence in her office late one night when she knew she was all alone.

References

Flemington, New Jersey
Buildings and structures in Hunterdon County, New Jersey
Hotels in New Jersey
Restaurants in New Jersey
Hotel buildings completed in 1814
1814 establishments in New Jersey
Hotel buildings completed in 1878
Reportedly haunted locations in New Jersey
Historic district contributing properties in New Jersey
Historic district contributing properties in Hunterdon County, New Jersey